Viana de Cega is a municipality located in the province of Valladolid, Castile and León, Spain. According to the 2004 census (INE), the municipality has a population of 1,716 inhabitants.

Gallery

See also
Cuisine of the province of Valladolid

References

Municipalities in the Province of Valladolid